Hostage is the sixth studio album, from American Christian rock band Resurrection Band (known at this time as "Rez Band"), released in late 1984.

Recording history
Hostage was a radical departure into keyboard-driven new wave stylings which dominate the record, and this is due in large part to the fact that bassist and keyboardist Jim Denton took over much of the songwriting. Although the lead-off track, "S.O.S.", was popular on Christian radio, long-time Rez Band fans were extremely divided over the band's new musical direction, especially with strange sonic experiments like "Armageddon Appetite".

At the same time, "Attention" and "Crimes" are typical Rez Band hard rock efforts, which indicated to surprised listeners at the time that the band hadn't completely abandoned the sound for which they had become known. Besides, the lyrical themes of war, inner-city violence (of which the band was intimately familiar) and the spiritual and moral confusion of youth are once again front and center.

"Crimes" was the band's first music video and was filmed in the same run-down urban neighborhood in which the Jesus People USA community is located. It received limited airplay on MTV.

Track listing
All songs written by Jim Denton unless otherwise noted
 "S.O.S." – 4:03
 "Attention" (Glenn Kaiser, Jon Trott, Roy Montroy, Stu Heiss) – 3:45
 "Souls for Hire" (Kaiser) – 3:30
 "Defective Youth" (Denton, John Herrin, Trott, Heiss) – 2:57
 "Who's Real Anymore" – 4:06
 "Armageddon Appetite" – 1:26
 "Beyond the Gun" (Kaiser, Denton) – 4:20
 "Crimes" (Kaiser, Denton, Herrin, Montroy, Heiss) – 3:38
 "It's You" (Trott) – 2:02
 "Tears in the Rain" (Denton, Herrin, Trott, Heiss) – 6:00
 "Walk Away" (Kaiser, Denton) – 4:50

Personnel

 Glenn Kaiser – lead and background vocals, guitars
 Wendi Kaiser – lead and background vocals
 Stu Heiss – lead guitar, keyboards
 Jim Denton – bass guitar, guitar, keyboards
 John Herrin – drums
 Steve Eisen – saxophone
 Tom Cameron – lead snoring
 Greg Jacques – door

Production
 Rez Band – producer
 Roger Heiss – engineer
 Roy Montroy – assistant engineer
 Greg Jacques – assistant engineer
 Steve Hall – mastering (at Future Disc)
 Cornerstone Graphics – album cover concept and art
 Janet Cameron  – album cover concept and art
 Dick Randall – album cover concept and art
 Pat Peterson – photography
 Tom Wray – photography

References

Resurrection Band albums
1984 albums